Dostonbek Tursunov (born 13 June 1995) is an Uzbekistani footballer who plays as a centre-back for Chongqing Liangjiang Athletic and the Uzbekistan national team.

Career
Tursunov was included in Uzbekistan's squad for the 2019 AFC Asian Cup in the United Arab Emirates.

Career statistics

Club

International

International goals
Scores and results list Uzbekistan's goal tally first.

References

External links
 
 
 

 Dostonbek Tursunov at WorldFootball.com

1995 births
Living people
People from Fergana Region
Uzbekistani footballers
Uzbekistan international footballers
Uzbekistan under-20 international footballers
Uzbekistan youth international footballers
Uzbekistani expatriate footballers
Association football central defenders
FK Neftchi Farg'ona players
PFK Metallurg Bekabad players
Renofa Yamaguchi FC players
Busan IPark players
J2 League players
Uzbekistan Super League players
K League 1 players
2019 AFC Asian Cup players
Uzbekistani expatriate sportspeople in Japan
Uzbekistani expatriate sportspeople in South Korea
Expatriate footballers in Japan
Expatriate footballers in South Korea